Peruvannapurathe Visheshangal is a 1989 Indian Malayalam-language romantic comedy film directed by Kamal and written by Ranjith from a story by Kamal, it was produced by Castle Productions. The film stars Jayaram as Sivasankaran, who arrives in Peruvannapuram village to join as the new peon in a college, and Parvathy as Kunjulakshmi, a student and an arrogant girl from a wealthy aristocratic family who owns the college. Mohanlal has a cameo role as Achutha Kurup. The music was composed by Johnson.

Plot 
Kunjulakshmi is the only daughter of the aristocratic Kavumpattu family in Peruvannapuram. She is pampered by her five brothers and is arrogant. The family owns the local college.

Sivasankaran comes to the college as a peon to replace Keeleri Padmanabhan, who fails to give the promised donation to the Kavumpattu family in return for the job. Padmanabhan is despondent at the loss of his job. People in the village goad him to make life miserable for the new peon so that he would leave the job and go leaving the post vacant for Padmanabhan.

Padmanabhan starts exhorting money from Sivasankaran. Sivasankaran, on the other hand, finds out that his job includes helping the Kavumpattu family in household chores. When he takes lunch for Kunju, she laughs at him and taunts him. In the meantime, Sivasankar stands up to Padmanabhan and refuses to give him any more of his money.

Padmanabhan resorts to stealing coconuts from the Kavumpattu family estate to earn some money. Sivasankaran catches them and in the scuffle he is accused of being the thief. He is let off on the intervention of the grandmother of the family. In the meantime, a love note that was written for Kunjulakshmi by a classmate ends up in her book and she accuses Sivasankaran of writing her the letter. Kunjulakshmi gets into a fight with Sivasankaran. Her brothers join the fight and Sivasankaran declares that he will marry Kunju in 15 days.

Although Kunjulakshmi hates Sivasankaran to that point, she realises that Sivasankaran is innocent. There is also a rumour that Sivasankaran is the son of Late Vamadevakurup and the erstwhile maid of Kavumpatt. All these melts the hatred that Kunjulakshmi had against Sivasankaran, which finally turns into sympathy and love. While everything were in their favour, things takes a turn with the appearance of Achutha Kurup / Achu, who is actually the son of the late Vamadeva Kurup of Kavumpattu and is a successful businessman in Singapore.

Cast 

Jayaram as Sivasankaran
Parvathi as Kunju Lakshmi
Jagathy Sreekumar as Keeleri Padmanabhan/Pappan
Philomina as Kunju Lakshmi's Grandmother
Innocent as Adiyodi
 P C George (actor) as Veerabhadrakurup (Valiya Kurup)
Shivaji as Kurup
Siddique as Antappan
Kalpana as Mohini
Kuthiravattam Pappu  as Pushpangadan
Oduvil Unnikrishnan as Appunni Nair
 Mammukoya as P. C. Peruvannapuram
 V. K. Sreeraman as Kannappakkurup
 Santhosh as Chandukkutty Kurup
 Kaviyoor Ponnamma as Devaki Amma
 K. P. A. C. Lalitha as Madhavi Amma
 Sankaradi as College Principal
 Jagadish as Balan
 Kundara Johnny as GopalaKurup
 Idavela Babu as Suresh
 Paravoor Bharathan as Kalari Gurukkal
 James
 Mohanlal as Achutha Kurup (Cameo appearance)

Production 
Initially, Kamal had Mohanlal in mind for the lead role when the story was envisioned, but later realising Mohanlal had done a similar character in an earlier film, the story background was changed to cast Jayaram in the lead, and Mohanlal appeared in a cameo role as Achutha Kurup, a significant character whose name is mentioned throughout the film and appears at the end.

Soundtrack 
The film's soundtrack contains songs, all composed by Johnson and Lyrics by P.K. Gopi.

Reception 
Peruvannapurathe Visheshangal was a major commercial success. Mohanlal's cameo role increased the film's box office performance. Jayaram told in an interview that filmmaker P. Vasu once revealed to him that his 1991 Tamil film Chinna Thambi was inspired from the film.

References

External links 
 

1989 films
1980s Malayalam-language films
1989 romantic comedy films
Indian romantic comedy films
Films directed by Kamal (director)
Indian family films
Films scored by Johnson
Films with screenplays by Ranjith
Films shot in Thrissur
Films shot in Palakkad